In the early morning hours of May 22, 2016, five people died after taking alleged illegal drugs during a rave dance party organized by Close-Up entitled Forever Summer, at the SM Mall of Asia concert grounds in Pasay, Philippines.

Incident and investigation
A report from Pasay city police stated that four casualties — namely Bianca Fontejon (18), American national Eric Anthony Miller (33), Ariel Leal (22) and Lance Garcia (36) — were found unconscious while the concert, called "Close-Up Forever Summer", was ongoing at the SM Mall of Asia. All four were brought to a hospital but died shortly thereafter. A fifth casualty — Ken Migawa (18), also found unconscious, was later brought to a hospital in critical condition and died the night of May 22. The five fatalities were not acquainted with each other. The deaths occurred hours after the concert began.

At the time of the concert, no bouncers or security personnel were present at the middle of gathering but about 70 policemen were deployed at the venue.

Investigating officer Giovanni Arcinue said that the police were looking at dehydration or heat stroke as possible causes as the country is in dry season brought about by El Niño. Netizens speculated that the victims took the recreational drug called "Green Amore", a lethal mix of ecstasy and methamphetamine. Investigators stated that the rumors on social media still presume that drug-laced drinks were the probable cause of their deaths.

Autopsy
On May 22, an autopsy report revealed that Fontejon and Garcia died due to sudden heart attack, this according to Dr. Wilfredo Esquivel Tierra, Assistant Chief of the National Bureau of Investigation (NBI) Medico-Legal Division. According to the medico legal report of NBI, it was shown that Fontejon had two types of dangerous drugs in her body: MDMA methylene homolog and synthetic cathinones. The NBI refused to speculate how it got into her body. The last two autopsies conducted by Superintendent Bonnie Chua, head of the Crime Laboratory of the Southern Police District (SPD), revealed that Migawa and Miller died of heart failure and brain swelling.

In a statement given on May 26, the NBI revealed that whatever the fatalities had ingested can be described as "explosive". It was potent enough to damage the heart and internal organs of the victims, which showed signs of ruptured tissues and blood vessels. According to the medico-legal officer assigned to the case, the autopsy results were unusual and it was his "first time to witness a severe form of organ damage". All parts of the heart were greatly damaged; the heart turned from pink in color to brown, red and black. The NBI also clarified that heart attack was not the only cause of the deaths, but also the simultaneous failure of internal organs — swelling of the brain, lungs, liver, intestines, spleen and kidneys.

On June 7, the PNP Crime Laboratory confirmed that the amphetamine-based metabolites para-Methoxyamphetamine and methylenedioxyamphetamine were found on the bodies of Migawa and Miller, in addition to traces of methylenedioxycathinone found on Migawa.

Suspects
On the morning of May 28, 2016, the NBI in coordination with the Philippine Drug Enforcement Agency (PDEA) arrested 23-year-old Joshua Habalo in an entrapment operation at a club at the Remington Hotel, located within the Resorts World Manila complex in Pasay. According to Senior Investigator Salvador Arteche Jr., Habalo offered the undercover NBI operatives five tablets of pink ecstasy worth ₱1,500 before the operatives seized the tablets, in addition to five sachets of suspected cocaine and another sachet of three green capsules suspected to be the "green amore", the designer drug believed to have been sold at the concert which the five victims may have taken. The NBI and the PDEA have said that Habalo will be charged of drug possession and selling of drugs under the Comprehensive Dangerous Drugs Act of 2002.

On June 1, 2016, the NBI arrested in a buy bust operation five persons allegedly involved in the sale of illegal drugs at the CloseUp Forever Summer concert. Arrested were Marc Deen, his wife Erica Valbuena, Thomas Halili, Martin Dimacali and Seergeoh Villanueva (alias Gio). During the buy bust operation conducted in Parañaque, Atty. Joel Tovera, chief of the NBI's Anti-Illegal Drugs Division, said it was Villanueva who handed a small medicine bottle containing 10 pieces of ecstasy pills after receiving the marked money. The NBI agents proceeded to the condominium unit where Deen was waiting for his share of the proceeds of the ecstasy sale. Inside Deen's condominium unit was a kitchen type laboratory where the illegal drugs were being manufactured. Also recovered in the operation were synthetic materials, various drug paraphernalia and a manual on making illegal drugs such as methamphetamine hydrochloride or shabu, D-lysergic acid diethylamide and gamma-Hydroxybutyric acid (GHB) or liquid ecstasy.

Reactions
In a statement posted on their official Facebook page, CloseUp extended their sympathies to the families of the fatalities, and vowed to extend medical assistance support so the victims may fully recover.

Then presumptive President-elect Rodrigo Duterte called a press conference on May 26 in response to the concert deaths. He questioned how illegal drugs entered the concert, despite police presence. He also called for reshuffling of police and military personnel, and increased security during concerts to prevent illegal drugs from being smuggled into the event.

Senator Tito Sotto said in a privilege speech in the Senate that the use of the over-the-counter drug "Wari-Activ" (muscle pain killer, also known as laughing gas) is one of the reasons for the death of 5 people in the concert.

Aftermath
On February 1, 2017, the National Bureau of Investigation (NBI) formally charged the executives of Unilever Philippines and their event organizers for criminal negligence before the Department of Justice. The NBI, representing several relatives of the victims, has said the respondents are criminally liable based on the responsible officer doctrine "for they held a position of responsibility and authority in their respective corporations, and had the ability to prevent the unwanted incidents but failed to do so."

See also
Anna Wood
Leah Betts
Philippine Drug War

References

2016 crimes in the Philippines
Health disasters in the Philippines
2016 health disasters
Crime in Metro Manila
History of Metro Manila
2016 in music
Drug-related deaths in the Philippines
May 2016 events in the Philippines